Cota is a wireless power technology built on the same principles and frequencies as Wi-Fi. Cota was announced on September 9, 2013 at TechCrunch Disrupt.

Features 
Cota can detect the position of a power receiver within its network and focus a signal to only that position, enabling up to 1 watt of power to be transmitted wirelessly. Since the charging hub can detect, focus, and send the signal to a specific point in 3D space, there is no risk of injury compared to other means of wireless power, such as microwave power transmission. Additionally, since Cota uses the same frequency range as Wi-Fi, its range is about 30 feet, an improvement over inductive wireless standards such as Qi which typically have a range of only a few centimeters.

FCC Approval
In June 2019 the Federal Communications Commission granted Ossia an equipment authorization for the Cota wireless power system (Cota Transmitter and Receiver), approving its wireless power delivery and data communications under Parts 18 and 15, respectively, of the FCC's rules and certifying the system to be marketed and sold in the U.S.

References 

Wireless energy transfer